François Rebello (born November 25, 1970) is a Canadian politician. Rebello is a former MNA in the province of Quebec. Rebello represented the riding of La Prairie in the National Assembly of Quebec in the 2008 provincial election, after an unsuccessful run in 2007. He was elected as a member of the Parti Québécois, but then joined the Coalition Avenir Québec. He was defeated in 2012.

On January 9, 2012, he announced he was joining the Coalition Avenir Québec, citing his admiration for its leader, François Legault. He had stated his loyalty to the Parti Québécois' chief, Pauline Marois, a couple of weeks prior to his defection. He was the CAQ's fifth member of the National Assembly and the third to be a former member of the Parti Québécois. In the 2012 provincial election, Rebello ran for the CAQ in the new electoral district of Sanguinet, but was defeated by Alain Therrien of the Parti Québécois.

Electoral record

References

External links
 

1970 births
Bloc Québécois candidates for the Canadian House of Commons
Candidates in the 2004 Canadian federal election
Coalition Avenir Québec MNAs
Living people
Parti Québécois MNAs
Politicians from Montreal
Université de Montréal alumni